Dombeya burgessiae, the rosemound, is a widespread species of flowering plant in the family Malvaceae. It is native to seasonally dry areas of tropical Africa, and has been introduced to Pakistan, Assam, and Trinidad and Tobago. It is occasionally planted as an ornamental.

References

burgessiae
Flora of South Sudan
Flora of the Democratic Republic of the Congo
Flora of East Tropical Africa
Flora of South Tropical Africa
Flora of the Northern Provinces
Flora of KwaZulu-Natal
Flora of Swaziland
Plants described in 1862